The free skating segment of figure skating, also called the free skate and the long program, is the second of two segments of competitions, skated after the short program. Its duration, across all disciplines, is four minutes for senior skaters and teams, and three and one-half minutes for junior skaters and teams. Vocal music with lyrics is allowed for all disciplines since the 2014—2015 season. The free skating program, across all disciplines, must be well-balanced and include certain elements described and published by the International Skating Union (ISU).

Overview 

The free skating program, also called the free skate or long program, along with the short program, is a segment of single skating, pair skating, and synchronized skating in international competitions and events for both junior and senior-level skaters. The free skating program is skated after the short program. Its duration, across all disciplines, is four minutes for senior skaters and teams, and three and one-half minutes for junior skaters and teams. Vocal music with lyrics has been allowed in all disciplines since the 2014—2015 season. The first time vocal music was allowed at the Olympics was in 2018.

According to figure skating historian James R. Hines, the Viennese style of figure skating, which developed into the international style adopted by the International Skating Union (ISU), the organization that oversees figure skating, "provides a direct link to modern free skating". Free skating, developed when skaters connected individual compulsory figures into a cohesive program, has been a part of international competitions throughout the ISU's history, becoming more important and popular after World War II. The free skate, along with compulsory figures, were segments in competitions until 1973, when the short program was added.

American skater Nathan Chen holds the highest single men's free skating program score of 224.92, which he earned at the 2019–20 Grand Prix of Figure Skating Final. Alexandra Trusova from Russia holds the highest single women's free skating score of 166.62, which she earned at 2019 Skate Canada. Anastasia Mishina and Aleksandr Galliamov from Russia hold the highest pairs free skating score of 157.46, which they earned at the 2022 European Championships.

Requirements

Single skating 
According to the ISU, a free skating program for men and women single skaters "consists of a well balanced program of Free Skating elements, such as jumps, spins, steps and other linking movements executed with minimal two-footed skating, in harmony with music of the Competitor’s choice". Skaters have "complete freedom" to select any free skating elements they choose; the sum of the elements make up an entire free skating program. All the elements must be linked together by connecting different steps and other free skating movements. Skaters must use the entire ice surface. Forward and backward crossovers, however, do not constitute connecting steps. If a skater performs more elements than what is prescribed, only the first attempt, or the allowed number of attempts, is counted in their final score.

A well-balanced free skate for junior and senior men and women single skaters must consist of the following: up to seven jump elements, one of which has to be an Axel jump; up to three spins, one of which has to be a spin combination (one a spin with just one position, and one flying spin with a flying entrance); only one step sequence; and only one choreographic sequence.

Skaters can execute up to three jump combinations or jump sequences in the free skating program and can consist of the same or a different single, double, triple, or quadruple jump. One jump combination may consist of up to three jumps, while the other two jump combinations can consist of up to two jumps. Any double jump, including the double Axel, cannot be included more than two times; i.e., as a solo jump or as part of a jump combination or jump sequence. Only two types of triple and quadruple jumps can be executed twice or attempted more than twice. Jumps are judged in the order of execution. The ISU requires that all spins "must be of a different character". Skaters must include a required number of revolutions in their spins: at least ten spins in their spin combinations and six revolutions for both their flying spin and the spin with only one position. Judges count the minimum number of required revolutions from the entry of the spin to, other than the wind-up in flying spins and spins with just one position, its exit. A change in foot is optional in the spin with spin combinations and spins with only one position.

Skaters have complete freedom in the selection of the kinds of step sequences they want to execute. They can include jumps in their step sequences, but they must fully utilize the ice surface. The ISU also states about step sequences: "Step sequences too short and barely visible cannot be considered as meeting the requirements of a step sequence". The pattern of choreographic sequences, which may be performed before or after the step sequence and must consist of at least two movements, is not restricted, but they must be clearly visible. They commence with the skaters' first skating movement and conclude with the "preparation to the next element", if it is not the last element of the free skating program. Additionally, skaters can use steps and turns to link two or more different movements together.

Pair skating 
According to the ISU, free skating for pairs "consists of a well balanced program composed and skated to music of the pair’s own choice for a specified
period of time".  The ISU also considers a good free skate one that contains both single skating moves performed either in parallel (called "shadow skating") or symmetrically (called "mirror skating") and "especially typical Pair Skating moves" such as pair spins, lifts, partner assisted jumps, spirals and other similar moves, "linked harmoniously by steps and other movements".

A well-balanced free skate for senior pairs must consist of the following: up to three lifts, not all from the same group, with the lifting arm or arms fully extended; only one twist lift, only one solo jump; only one jump sequence or combination; only one pair spin combination; only one death spiral of a different type than what the skaters performed during their short program; and only one choreographic sequence.  A junior pair free skating program must consist of the following: up to two lifts, not all from the same group, with the lifting arm or arms fully extended; only one twist lift; up to two different throw jumps; only one solo jump; only one jump sequence or combination; only one death spiral; and only one choreographic sequence.  If a pairs team performs any number of elements more than what has been prescribed, only the first attempt (or the legal number of attempts) will be included in their final score.

Synchronized skating 
A well-balanced free skate for synchronized skating must consist of elements and other linking movements that reflect the character of the music the teams choose and/or expresses a story, theme, idea, or concept also chosen by the team. The ISU, out of the following 14 elements, chooses and publicizes up to 10 required elements for junior free skating programs and up to 11 required elements for senior free skating programs yearly. These elements include: an artistic element, a creative element, an intersection element, a group lift element (only for senior teams, when required), a line or block linear element, a mixed element, a move element, a no-hold element, a pair element, a line or black pivoting element, a wheel or circle rotating element, a synchronized spin element, a wheel or circle traveling element, and a twizzle element. These elements must be "linked together harmoniously by a variety of connections and executed with a minimum of two footed skating".

References

Notes

Citations

Sources 
 "Special Regulations & Technical Rules Single & Pair Skating and Ice Dance 2021". (S&P/ID 2022) International Skating Union. 2022. Retrieved 29 September 2022.
 "Special Regulations & Technical Rules Synchronized Skating 2022". (SS Rules 2022) International Skating Union. 2022. Retrieved 29 September 2022.

Figure skating